is a railway station on the Taita Line in the city of Minokamo, Gifu Prefecture, Japan, operated by Central Japan Railway Company (JR Tōkai). This station is near the bank of the Kiso River, which the line crosses between this station and Kani Station.

Lines

Station layout
Mino-Kawai Station has one ground-level side platform serving a single, curved, bi-directional track. The station is unattended.

Adjacent stations

|-
!colspan=5|JR Central

History
Mino-Kawai Station opened on December 26, 1952. The station was absorbed into the JR Tōkai network upon the privatization of the Japanese National Railways (JNR) on April 1, 1987.

Passenger statistics
In fiscal 2016, the station was used by an average of 431 passengers daily (boarding passengers only).

Surrounding area
 Kiso River

See also
 List of Railway Stations in Japan

References

External links

Railway stations in Gifu Prefecture
Taita Line
Railway stations in Japan opened in 1952
Stations of Central Japan Railway Company
Minokamo, Gifu